Jews outside Europe under Axis occupation suffered greatly during the Holocaust and World War II. There was no exception to the Nazis' policy of racial discrimination and physical annihilation of the Jews. As stated by Yehuda Bauer, academic advisor at Yad Vashem, "regarding the Jews, the perpetrators were equal opportunity killers."

In European North Africa
There were 400,000 Jews in France on the other side of the Mediterranean in North Africa (French Algeria, which was an integral part of metropolitan France, the French Protectorate in Morocco and the French protectorate of Tunisia). They were included in the number relevant to "the Final Solution to the Jewish Question in Europe" under: "France/unoccupied territory 700,000 (see Sir Martin Gilbert's the Dent Atlas of the Holocaust, p. 99) 
 
Like the Jews of Denmark, the Jews of Europe's four territories in North Africa were spared the mass deportations that happened in some countries and territories under Nazi occupation or in the German sphere of influence.

Jews of Italian Libya in the Shoah

Libya was under Italian rule. The Jews, who were British and Italian subjects, suffered from antisemitism and economic restrictions as a result of the strengthening of Italy's relationship with Germany. From 1942, laws of racial discrimination were activated in Libya. Men between the ages of 18 and 45 were recruited to forced labor and thousands died from hunger and epidemics. In February of that year, the Germans ordered the transfer of the Jews to concentration camps.

Jews of Vichy-Algeria in the Shoah

Vichy France (that ruled in Algeria from 1940) cancelled the citizenship of the Jews and instituted the same restrictions that applied to the Jews in metropolitan France. It forbade them from working for the government or as bankers, teachers and students. In addition, the number of Jews permitted to work in free professions was limited.  In 1941, the property of the Jews was confiscated. However, in a sign of the solidarity in suffering, not a single Muslim Algerian took advantage of Jewish confiscated property; on a Friday in 1941, religious leaders throughout Algiers delivered sermons warning Muslims against participation in schemes to strip Jews of their property. The suffering of the Jews of Algeria was worsened by their previous high position in society. In 1941, some Jews joined the anti-Nazi underground. Many Jews were caught and were sent to labor camps or were executed. The Judenräte required assistance in preparation of materiel. In November 1942 Algeria was liberated
ed by the United States and Great Britain. In 1943, the restraints on the Jews of Algeria were officially cancelled.

Jews of Vichy-Tunisia in the Shoah

Tunisia was also ruled by pro-Nazi Vichy France, which extended its anti-Jewish measures to Morocco and Algeria. In November 1942 Nazi Germany occupied French Tunisia for six months, until May 1943. SS Oberstrumbannführer Walter Rauff, a brutal and notorious killer involved in the development of death gas vans and the Final Solution in Eastern Europe, was posted as commander of Tunis. From July 1942 until May 1943, he headed an Einsatzkommando to take care of the Jewish Question in Tunisia, and to continue to implement the Final Solution in Vichy-Tunisia. Oswald Pohl, charged by Himmler to organize the camps in Eastern Europe, joined him. Despite constant attacks by the Allies, Rauff instigated drastic anti-Jewish policies.

The Nazis established a local Judenrat, took hostages, confiscated the property of the Jews (aryanization) and imposed on the community heavy financial punishments. The community was required to provide the needs of the German army, and the synagogue become a German storeroom. The Jews were marked with the Yellow badge, 5,000 Jews were sent to more than 30 slave labor camps in Tunisia and a few were sent to the extermination camps. Many Jews were murdered by means of being shot in their homes, death marches, hunger, diseases and bombings.

Tunisia was occupied by the Allies in May 1943, and the persecution of the Jews ceased. It was the first Jewish community to be liberated from Nazi Germany.

Jews of Vichy-Morocco in the Shoah

In 1940, the Nazi-controlled Vichy government issued antisemitic decrees excluding Jews from public functions and imposing the wear of the yellow Magen David star. Sultan Mohamed V refused to apply these laws and, as sign of defiance, insisted on inviting all the rabbis of Morocco to the 1941 throne celebrations.

In Asia

Jews of Iraq in the Shoah

While not under occupation by Nazi Germany, Iraq was, for a short term, under the Nazi-allied regime of Rashid Ali al-Gaylani. While the regime did not last long, the Farhud (a pogrom in which 180 Jews died) is considered among its results.

Jews in Japan and China

Prior to the war there was a small Jewish presence in Japan, particularly Kobe, which consisted of Jews originating predominantly from Russia, as well as those from the Middle East, Eastern Europe and the United States.  In Japanese-occupied China there was a more significant Jewish population, including White Russian refugees and Baghdadi Jews. As Jewish persecution in Europe stepped up an increasing number of refugees travelled to China by steamship or had transited through the Soviet Union and were hoping to move on to the United States.  Most of these Jews were concentrated in the Shanghai International Settlement.

When Japan entered the war many Jews were interned, including the Baghdadi Jews who were identified as British subjects.  The Japanese implemented strict measures to control the activities of the Shanghai ghetto who were restricted in 1943 to a one square mile city block shared with 100,000 Chinese.  However despite repeated requests from Nazi Germany to implement antisemitic policies, including exterminating the Jewish population in the Shanghai ghetto, the Jewish population was generally left alone (apart from wartime privations).

References

Further reading

Robert Satloff: Among the Righteous: Lost Stories from the Holocaust's Long Reach into Arab Lands (PublicAffairs, 2006). 
 Michel Abitbol: The Jews of North Africa during the Second World War (Wayne state University Press Detroit, 1989). 
 Cohen, Asher, The Shoah in France (Jerusalem: Yad Vashem, 1996). The book also deals with the persecution of the Jews in Vichy France-North Africa.
 Documents pour servir à l'histoire de la Guerre; par Service d'Information des Crimes de Guerre, Crimes ennemis en France - La persecution raciale. (Paris: Archives du service de recherche des crimes de guerre ennemis, Office français d'édition, 20 février 1947); the text tells the story of the racial persecution of the Jews in metropolitan France and in Vichy France-North Africa. The book has a special chapter on Vichy France-Tunisia under Nazi rule.
 Kaspi, André, Les Juifs pendant l'Occupation, (Paris: Seuil, 1991). Kaspi tells the story of the persecution of the Jews in metropolitan France and in Vichy France-North Africa.
 Kaspi, André, Les Juifs pendant l'Occupation, (Paris: Seuil, 1991). Kaspi tells the story of the persecution of the Jews in metropolitan France and in Vichy France-North Africa.
 Poliakov, Léon, France - The Fate of the French Jews, in the Algemeyne Entsiklopedya (New York: Shulsinger Pubs. and Dubnov Fund & Entsiklopedye Komitet: 1966), Section "Yidn" vol. 7. Poliakov's article appeared in a section of the encyclopedia devoted to the Holocaust in various European countries. The geographic regions of Algeria, Morocco and Tunisia, appeared as sub-headings under the title of 'France.' Poliakov's article is called in English translation:  "The Fate of the French Jews."
 Sabille, Jacques. Les Juifs de Tunisie sous Vichy et l'Occupation. (Paris: . Editions du Centre de Documentation Juive Contemporaine, 1954)
 Yahil, Leni, The Holocaust: The Fate of European Jewry, 1932–1945 (New York: Oxford University Press, 1990). Yahil tells the story of the persecutions, deportations, and murder of the Jews of European North Africa (French North Africa and Italian Libya) in her chapters about "European Jewry" in the sub-headings "France" and "Italy," respectively. Yahil ystematically explores the evolution of the Holocaust in German-occupied Europe. Leni Yahil's book won the Shazar Prize, one of Israel's highest awards for historical work.

External links
Voices on Antisemitism Interview with Robert Satloff from the United States Holocaust Memorial Museum
The Holocaust Explained website
Point of No Return: Jewish Refugees from Arab Countries
Is China trying to co-opt the Holocaust?

The Holocaust
World War II national military histories
Politics of World War II
History of the Jews in the Middle East